"Kiss Away the Pain" is a song by American singer Patti LaBelle featuring saxophonist George Howard. It was written by Alex Brown and Ron Kersey and recorded by LaBelle for her eighth studio album, Winner in You (1986), with production helmed by Kersey and James R. "Budd" Ellison. The song was released as a single in 1986 and peaked at number 13 on the US Billboard Hot R&B/Hip-Hop Songs, staying on the chart for 16 weeks. "Kiss Away the Pain" was originally recorded by Gladys Knight & The Pips for their 1983 album Visions but not included until that album was re-issued as an expanded edition in 2014.

Track listing

Credits and personnel 
Credits adapted from the liner notes of Winner in You.

Alex Brown – writer
James R. "Budd" Ellison – producer
Patti LaBelle – executive producer 
Ron Kersey – producer, writer

Charts

References 

Songs about kissing
1986 singles
Patti LaBelle songs
Songs written by Ron Kersey
MCA Records singles
1986 songs
Soul ballads
Pop ballads
1980s ballads